Celestial Peak is a granite peak,  high,  north of Mount Blowaway in the Wilson Hills. It was first mapped by the United States Geological Survey Topo West survey party, 1962–63, and named by the northern party of the New Zealand Geological Survey Antarctic Expedition (NZGSAE), 1963–64, which occupied the peak as a survey and gravity station. So named by NZGSAE because the party's first observations of celestial stars were made nearby.

References 

Mountains of Oates Land